The discography of the cast of the American film series High School Musical—primarily composed of Zac Efron, Vanessa Hudgens, Ashley Tisdale, Lucas Grabeel, Corbin Bleu and Monique Coleman—consists of three soundtrack albums, one live album, five compilation albums, two remix albums, one extended play and twelve singles. All albums and singles were released on Walt Disney Records. Collectively, the three soundtrack albums have sold 9.8 million copies in the United States, as of January 2016.

Albums

Soundtrack albums

Live albums

Compilation albums

Remix albums

Extended plays

Singles

Other charted songs

Notes

References

Discographies of American artists
Film and television discographies